Fred Kupferman (25 January 1934 – 27 April 1988) was a French historian. He was Jewish, and he was forced to wear a yellow badge during World War II. He lost his father in the Holocaust.

Kupferman was a professor of history at Sciences Po and the University of Paris. He was the author of several history books about Vichy France. He also co-wrote two children's books with his wife. Kupferman had a wife, Sigrid. He died on 27 April 1988 in Paris, France.

Works

History books

Children's books

References

1934 births
1988 deaths
20th-century French historians
20th-century French Jews
Academic staff of Sciences Po
Academic staff of the University of Paris
French children's writers
Historians of Vichy France